William J. Atkinson (born about 1950), an American, is a senior scientist at Boeing Satellite Systems who was named a Fellow of the American Physical Society in 2011. An expert in nuclear and space radiation hardening and electro-optics, he was cited for "academic contributions in the areas of nuclear physics and for substantial applications of radiation technology to spaceborne applications in the aerospace community." In 2011, he was also honored as an Associate Fellow of the American Institute of Aeronautics and Astronautics.

IEEE Spectrum reported Atkinson "developed software known as TSAREME (short for Total Space and Atmospheric Radiation Effects on Microelectronics) to account for errors induced by the impact of radiation in near-Earth orbits and inside the atmosphere."

Selected publications

References 

1950 births
Fellows of the American Physical Society
Boeing people
Living people